Assumed Killer (also titled Assumed Memories) is a 2013 American thriller drama film written and directed by Bernard Salzmann and starring Casper Van Dien, Barbie Castro, Armand Assante, Christie Lynn Smith and Eric Roberts.  Salzmann and Castro produced the film and Van Dien served as co-producer.

Plot

Cast
Casper Van Dien as Sam Morrow
Barbie Castro as Daria Valez Morrow
Armand Assante as Aaron Banfield
Christie Lynn Smith as Sara
Eric Roberts as Taxi Driver
William R. Moses as Dr. Green
Nancy Stafford as Dr. Weston
Antoni Corone as Detective Maurer
Marc Macaulay as Chief Grimaldi
Carmen Lopez as Clara
Alexa Hamilton as Sophia Summerfield
Cary Wayne Moore as Randy Summerfield

Production
The film was shot in Fort Lauderdale, Florida.

Reception
Sloan Freer of Radio Times gave the film two stars out of five.

References

External links
 
 

2013 films
American thriller drama films
Films shot in Florida
2013 thriller drama films
2013 drama films
2010s English-language films
2010s American films